Nitzschia granulata is a species of diatom belonging to the family Bacillariaceae.

This species inhabits freshwater environments.

References

Bacillariales